Ngân Thị Vạn Sự (born 29 April 2001) is a Vietnamese footballer who plays as a forward for Women's Championship club Hà Nội I and the Vietnam women's national team.

International career
She represented Vietnam at the 2022 AFC Women's Asian Cup in India and won a gold medal at the 2021 SEA Games on home soil.

International goals
Scores and results are list Vietnam's goal tally first.

References

2001 births
Living people
Women's association football forwards
Vietnamese women's footballers
Vietnam women's international footballers
21st-century Vietnamese women